Robert Alexander QC FRS FSA (18 January 1795 – 21 February 1843) was a British barrister.

He was the son of the Halifax, West Yorkshire solicitor Lewis Alexander and he studied law at Lincoln's Inn before he became a barrister. He was a founder of Halifax's Literary and Philosophical Society, and was made a fellow of the Royal Society in 1835.

He in 1829 married Matilda Legard, who was the daughter of Sir Thomas Legard of the Royal Navy. 

Robert Alexander died in London in 1843 and was buried in the churchyard of St. Nicholas Church, Ganton, Yorkshire.

References

External links
 findagrave memorial

1795 births
1843 deaths
People from Halifax, West Yorkshire
Members of Lincoln's Inn
Fellows of the Royal Society